Dorothy Margaret Eber,  ( Harley; March 18, 1925 – August 16, 2022) was a British-born Canadian author and one of the first people to transcribe and publish oral histories of Inuit in Nunavut in both English and Inuktitut. 

During the 1970s, she was one of the first writers to record their oral history on tape. She then completed the first oral biography of an Inuk, Pitseolak Ashoona, based on first hand accounts. Printed in both English and Inuktitut, it is said that Pitseolak: Pictures out of my Life was the first book, after the Bible, to be published in the Inuit language. Her multiple other works, including films and exhibitions, as well as her written material, have provided Canadians with a better understanding of Inuit culture. 

She was invited regularly to present at museums and cultural institutions worldwide, international conferences, and has contributed articles to international journals. She served on committees to judge annual Inuit art competitions.

Biography
Eber was born in Bromley, England of Welsh and Nova Scotian parentage, she spent her early childhood in both Wales and England. She attended schools in Wales, England, Ontario and Nova Scotia's Edgehill School for Girls. She was also a graduate of the University of Toronto. After graduation she worked as a reporter and in 1968 made her first trip to the Arctic to the community of Cape Dorset, famous for its Inuit artists. She returned in 1970 to do interviews with the graphic artist Pitseolak Ashoona. The book, with Ashoona's drawings and prints, was published the next year and has never been out of print. Since that time she has undertaken many more interview projects in the North. 

Tapes for her interviews are deposited in the Canadian Museum of Civilization, Ottawa. Over two summers, she also interviewed many elderly residents of Baddeck, Nova Scotia, who worked with Alexander Graham Bell on the hydrofoil and the tetrahedral kites which he developed there after the telephone made him famous. Her book Genius at Work: Images of Alexander Graham Bell was published in 1982 by Viking Press, New York and later by Nimbus, Halifax, Nova Scotia.

Death
Eber died from pneumonia in Oakville, Ontario, on August 16, 2022, at the age of 97.

Selected bibliography

References

External links
Listening to the North:  Dorothy Harley Eber's Oral Histories

1925 births
2022 deaths
20th-century Canadian women writers
Canadian non-fiction writers
Canadian women historians
English emigrants to Canada
Members of the Order of Canada
Oral historians of indigenous American culture
University of Toronto alumni